Matthew Banks (born 20 July 1976) is a former Australian rules footballer who played with Essendon in the Australian Football League (AFL).

Banks was initially drafted in 1995 but soon lost his place on the senior list, before returning to the list after a strong season in the reserves.

He has the distinction of playing in two Anzac Day clashes, despite playing only three senior games for Essendon. He made his league debut in the 1997 Anzac Day fixture and played on Collingwood full-forward Saverio Rocca. Two weeks later he was again the Essendon full-back, chosen to play on Adelaide star Tony Modra. His first and final league games was another Anzac Day match in 1998 when he injured his shoulder.

References

External links
 
 

1976 births
Australian rules footballers from Victoria (Australia)
Essendon Football Club players
Eastern Ranges players
Living people